Thomas Chalmers was a Scottish divine and a leader of the Free Church of Scotland.

Thomas Chalmers is also the name of:

 Thomas Chalmers (rugby) (1850–1926), Scottish rugby player
Thomas A. Chalmers, for whom the Szilard–Chalmers effect is named
 Dr. Thomas C. Chalmers (1917–1995), proponent of the randomized controlled trial and meta-analysis
Tom Chalmers of Darwin Press
Thomas Chalmers Harbaugh (1849–1924), poet and novelist
Thomas Chalmers Vint (1894–1967), landscape architect
 Thomas Hardie Chalmers (1884–1966), American opera singer, actor, and filmmaker
 Tommy Chalmers (1883–1918), Scottish footballer